Giovanni Maria Mariani was an Italian painter of the Baroque period, active mainly in Siena and Rome in the preparation of stage opera sets and scenography.

References

17th-century Italian painters
Italian male painters
Italian scenic designers
Italian Baroque painters
Year of death unknown
Year of birth unknown